Roger Mathis (4 April 1921 – 9 July 2015) was a Swiss football defender who played for Switzerland in the 1954 FIFA World Cup. He also played for FC Lausanne-Sport. Mathis died in July 2015 at the age of 94.

References

1921 births
2015 deaths
Swiss men's footballers
Switzerland international footballers
Association football defenders
FC Lausanne-Sport players
1954 FIFA World Cup players
Swiss Super League players